Ben Stephen Oakley (born 9 May 1982) is an Australian cricketer. He made his Twenty20 debut on 22 December 2013, for the Adelaide Strikers, in the 2013–14 Big Bash League season.

References

External links
 

1982 births
Living people
Australian cricketers
Adelaide Strikers cricketers
Place of birth missing (living people)